Atlantic High School is a public high school located in Port Orange, Florida, United States. The school opened in 1994 and currently serves about 1,300 students in grades 9 to 12 as part of the Volusia County Schools system.

Athletics
The schools athletic teams are known as the Atlantic Sharks. Sports typically offered include football, baseball, softball, and volleyball.

The school has a history of athletic accomplishments, including being the Women's Bowling State Champions in 2010 and 2014, the Men's Basketball District Champions in 2016, and Tennis State Champions in 2016.

References

External links 

Educational institutions in the United States with year of establishment missing
High schools in Volusia County, Florida
Public high schools in Florida
Buildings and structures in Port Orange, Florida
Educational institutions established in 1994
1994 establishments in the United States